Alessandra Januario Dos Santos (born ) is a Brazilian volleyball player.

With her club SESI-SP she competed at the 2014 FIVB Volleyball Women's Club World Championship.

References

External links

1988 births
Living people
Brazilian women's volleyball players
Place of birth missing (living people)